John McEnroe defeated Vitas Gerulaitis in the final, 7–5, 6–3, 6–3 to win the men's singles tennis title at the 1979 US Open. It was his first major singles title.

Jimmy Connors was the defending champion, but was defeated in the semifinals by McEnroe. Connors' loss ended a record streak of five consecutive US Open finals, a record since broken by Ivan Lendl.

During the second round, Ilie Năstase was defaulted from his match against John McEnroe. The umpire had docked Năstase a point in the third set and then a game in the fourth for arguing and stalling. A near riot followed as the crowd disagreed with the umpire's decision, by throwing beer cans and cups on court. The match was eventually restarted with the umpire being replaced before McEnroe came out the winner. McEnroe did not have to play in the third round (a walkover against Lloyd) and only had to play three games in the quarterfinals (retirement by Eddie Dibbs).

Seeds
The seeded players are listed below. John McEnroe is the champion; others show the round in which they were eliminated.

  Björn Borg (quarterfinalist)
  Jimmy Connors (semifinalist)
  John McEnroe (champion)
  Vitas Gerulaitis (finalist)
  Roscoe Tanner (semifinalist)
  Guillermo Vilas (fourth round)
  Harold Solomon (fourth round)
  Víctor Pecci Sr. (third round)
  Eddie Dibbs (quarterfinalist)
  José Luis Clerc (fourth round)
  Brian Gottfried (fourth round)
  Wojtek Fibak (second round)
  Gene Mayer (third round)
  Tim Gullikson (fourth round)
  Adriano Panatta (first round)
  John Alexander (second round)

Draw

Key
 Q = Qualifier
 WC = Wild card
 LL = Lucky loser
 r = Retired

Final eight

Section 1

Section 2

Section 3

Section 4

Section 5

Section 6

Section 7

Section 8

References

External links
 Association of Tennis Professionals (ATP) – 1979 US Open Men's Singles draw
1979 US Open – Men's draws and results at the International Tennis Federation

Men's singles
US Open (tennis) by year – Men's singles